The Church Mouse is a 1934 British comedy film directed by Monty Banks and starring Laura La Plante, Ian Hunter and Edward Chapman. It was made by the British subsidiary of Warner Brothers at the company's Teddington Studios. It was made as a more expensive production than much of the studio's low-budget quota quickie output.

It is based on a 1928 play by Ladislas Fodor which has been turned into films on several occasions including a 1931 German film Poor as a Church Mouse and the 1932 American production Beauty and the Boss. A bank owner's prim and uptight Secretary suddenly blossoms during a business trip to Paris.

Plot
The opening scenes show the historical development of Steele's Bank in London as it adopts first steel pens and then typewriters during the nineteenth century. In 1934 the current head of the bank Jonathan Steele is as technology-obsessed as his predecessors and installs an intercom and constantly flies by plane.

Steele strictly divides his life between work and pleasure. He dismisses a very attractive secretary who is distracting him by trying to seduce him at work, in order that they can become lovers after office hours. This creates a vacancy which a hard-pressed young woman, Betty Miller, who self-describes herself as a "church mouse", fills by showing Steele how super-efficient she is.

Miller rapidly becomes invaluable to Steele, but comes to resent the fact that only sees her as an employee rather than a woman. While in Paris, in order to seal a major business deal she has a major makeover, and suddenly finds herself attracting a great deal of male attention.

Cast
 Laura La Plante as Betty 'Miss Church Mouse' Miller
 Ian Hunter as Jonathan Steele
 Edward Chapman as Mr. 'Pinky' Wormwood
 Jane Carr as Miss Sylvia James
 Clifford Heatherley as Sir Oswald Bottomley
 John Batten as Geoffrey Steele
 Gibb McLaughlin as Thomas Stubbings, Cashier
 Monty Banks as Harry Blump, the Window Washer
 Florence Wood  as Betty's Mother

References

Bibliography
 Low, Rachael. Filmmaking in 1930s Britain. George Allen & Unwin, 1985.
 Wood, Linda. British Films, 1927-1939. British Film Institute, 1986.

External links

British historical comedy films
1930s historical comedy films
1934 films
1930s English-language films
Films directed by Monty Banks
British remakes of German films
First National Pictures films
Warner Bros. films
Films shot at Teddington Studios
Films set in England
British black-and-white films
Films set in London
Films set in Paris
Films set in the 19th century
British films based on plays
1930s business films
1930s British films